Palaeosepsis is a genus of flies in the family Sepsidae.

Species
Palaeosepsis bucki Ozerov, 2004
Palaeosepsis chauliobrechma Silva, 1993
Palaeosepsis dentata (Becker, 1919)
Palaeosepsis dentatiformis (Duda, 1926)
Palaeosepsis eberhardi Ozerov, 2004
Palaeosepsis golovastik Ozerov, 2004
Palaeosepsis maculata (Duda, 1926)
Palaeosepsis morula Ozerov, 2004
Palaeosepsis punctulata Ozerov, 2004

References

Sepsidae
Diptera of South America
Taxa named by Oswald Duda
Brachycera genera